The 2014 Pan American Women's 7x7 Wheelchair Handball Championship was the first edition and was hosted for the first time in Argentina from 17 to 20 September 2014.

Preliminary round
''All times are local (UTC-3)

Final

Ranking and statistics

Final ranking

References

2015 Women's 7x7
Pan American Women's 7x7 Wheelchair Handball Championship
Pan American Women's 7x7 Wheelchair Handball Championship
Pan American Women's 7x7 Wheelchair Handball Championship
International handball competitions hosted by Argentina
Pan American Women's 7x7 Wheelchair Handball Championship